Andrius Šidlauskas (born 6th of April 1997) is a Lithuanian breaststroke swimmer.

In 2015 Šidlauskas won gold and bronze in 2015 FINA World Junior Swimming Championships. In 2016 he qualified for the 2016 Summer Olympics.

In 2019, he represented Lithuania at the 2019 World Aquatics Championships held in Gwangju, South Korea.

International championships (50 m)

 Team Lithuania was disqualified in the heats

References 

Lithuanian male breaststroke swimmers
1997 births
Living people
Swimmers at the 2015 European Games
Swimmers at the 2016 Summer Olympics
Olympic swimmers of Lithuania
European Games gold medalists for Lithuania
European Games silver medalists for Lithuania
European Games medalists in swimming
Swimmers at the 2020 Summer Olympics
European Aquatics Championships medalists in swimming
20th-century Lithuanian people
21st-century Lithuanian people